Division No. 8 is a census division on the north coast of the island of Newfoundland in the province of Newfoundland and Labrador, Canada. It has a land area of 9,314.57 km² (3,596.4 sq mi) and had a population of 33,940 at the 2016 census. Its largest communities are the towns of Lewisporte, Springdale, and Twillingate.

Towns

Demographics

Unorganized subdivisions

References

Sources

008